Milena Govich (Serbian: Милена Гович, born October 29, 1976) is an American actress, director, singer, dancer, and musician, best known for portraying NYPD Detective Nina Cassady on the television series Law & Order.

Early life and education
Govich was born in Norman, Cleveland County, Oklahoma. Both of her parents, Dr. Bruce Michael Govich, who died in 1998, and Dr. Marilyn Green Govich, are professors of music: Bruce worked at University of Oklahoma and Marilyn currently teaches voice at the University of Central Oklahoma. Her father was Serbian and her mother is of Scottish and English ancestry. Her aunt, Milica Govich, is also an actress who has appeared on Broadway, television, and film.

Milena graduated from Norman High School in 1995 as valedictorian of her class. She followed her academic parents by graduating from the University of Central Oklahoma, once again graduating valedictorian with a double-degree in performance and pre-medical studies, and a minor in dance and violin. After graduation, Govich moved to New York City to pursue an acting career.

Career
Govich has appeared on Broadway in the musical revival of Cabaret, joining the 1998–2004 production in December 2000. She began in the role of Lulu, featuring her singing, dancing, and playing violin, and was the understudy and eventual replacement for the lead role, Sally Bowles. Govich also performed on Broadway in the 2002 musical revival of The Boys from Syracuse and in the musical Good Vibrations. She starred as Millie in the first regional production of Thoroughly Modern Millie. In July 2012, Govich starred in the title role of Sweet Charity at The Lyric Theatre.

On television, Govich first gained national attention in the United States as Gabby in the pilot episode of CBS's Love Monkey, then as the prostitute/con-artist Candy on Rescue Me. She also starred in the Dick Wolf-produced series Conviction and then starred on Wolf's flagship series, Law & Order, as Detective Nina Cassady.  She played the role for one season.

She has been featured or recurred on numerous other television shows: as New Orleans District Attorney Lyndsey Swann in the 20th Century Fox Television show K-Ville; as Assistant District Attorney Tracy Hunt on the CBS series The Defenders; and as Regina Turner on Make It or Break It.

She played a leading role on the MTV drama, Finding Carter.

Govich has also appeared in several films, including 2004's Bad Behavior, 2006's In Love, 2009's Sordid Things, 2011's A Novel Romance, starring opposite Steve Guttenberg, and Lucky N#mbr, starring opposite Method Man.

Law & Order
Govich played the part of Jessica Rossi on the short-lived 2006 NBC legal drama Conviction, created by Dick Wolf. The day after that show was cancelled, Wolf invited her to join the cast of Law & Order for the 17th season, which premiered on September 22, 2006. Govich played Det. Nina Cassady, who joined the cast as the junior partner when Jesse L. Martin's character, Det. Ed Green, was elevated to senior partner upon the retirement of Det. Joe Fontana, who was portrayed by Dennis Farina. Govich guest-starred, as a different character, on the Law & Order episode "Flaw" (Season 16, Episode 2) in 2005, joining a list of Law & Order cast regulars who did the same before having a starring role in the series. Reuters reported on June 1, 2007, that Govich would be replaced by Jeremy Sisto.

Directing 
Govich was one of eight filmmakers selected for the American Film Institute's Directing Workshop for Women, mentored by Paul Feig. Her directorial debut short film, Temporary (which gained her acceptance into AFI) has won multiple awards on the film festival circuit.

Her upcoming short film, Unspeakable, written by David Cornue, is currently in post-production. It will serve as an episodic proof of concept for a one-hour TV drama, also written by Cornue. As of May 2020, it remains unreleased.

Twelve years after leaving Law & Order, Govich reunited with Wolf as a director and co-executive producer for his CBS series FBI.

Personal life
Govich is married to David Cornue, a writer, composer and film producer.

On October 10, 2008, Govich sang the U.S. national anthem at the New Jersey Devils home opener at the Prudential Center in Newark, New Jersey.  She has also appeared twice on tour as the guest performer with Taiwanese pop star Fei Xiang.

Filmography

Film

Television

Director

References

External links

Alumni article about Milena Govich
Milena Govich at Broadway World.com

1976 births
Actresses from Oklahoma
American musical theatre actresses
American people of English descent
American people of Scottish descent
American people of Serbian descent
American television actresses
Living people
Musicians from Norman, Oklahoma
University of Central Oklahoma alumni
Singers from Oklahoma
21st-century American women